Kaaku? is a 2019 Maldivian romantic horror film directed by Mohamed Aboobakuru. Produced under Me Production, the film stars Ibrahim Sobah, Shafiu Mohamed and Irufana Ibrahim in pivotal roles. The film was released on 24 September 2019.

Cast 
 Hamid Ali as Ayyoob
 Aishath Yasira as Reema 
Irufana Ibrahim as Soby            
 Shafiu Mohamed as Naushad
 Ibrahim Sobah as Fazeen
 Nazima Mohamed as Naahidhaa
 Rizwana Ibrahim as Azu
 Abdullah Waheed as Kareembe
 Mohamed Adam as Shopkeeper
 Abbas Adam as Hussainbe
 Mohamed Aboobakuru as Policeman (special appearance)

Development
Filming was started on 26 October 2018 in HDh. Kulhudhuffushi and was completed in twenty days.

Release
The teaser trailer of the film was released on 4 March 2019. The release date of the film was announced to be 10 August 2019 and was later moved to 24 September 2019.

References

External links 
 

2019 films
Maldivian horror films